Angoor  is a 1982 Indian Hindi-language comedy film. It stars Sanjeev Kumar and Deven Verma in double roles, and directed by Gulzar. It is a remake of the Indian film Do Dooni Char, which was a remake of 1963 Bengali language comedy film Bhranti Bilas, that is based on Ishwar Chandra Vidyasagar's Bengali novel by the same name, which itself is based on Shakespeare's play The Comedy of Errors and was adapted by Rohit Shetty as Cirkus. All characters are naïve and destiny plays the main role in bringing all characters to one place. Most of the other films are generally based on false characters and deliberately make false statements to fool others.

Plot

The film is about two pairs of identical twins separated at birth and how their lives go haywire when they meet in adulthood.

Raj Tilak (Utpal Dutt) and his wife (Shammi) are on a trip with their twin sons, both of whom they call Ashok. Since they look the same, they should be called the same, is Mr Tilak's reasoning. As fate would have it, they adopt another set of twins, both of whom they call Bahadur. An unfortunate accident then divides the family, leaving each parent with one child out of each pair of twins.

A few years later, Ashok (Sanjeev Kumar) is married to Sudha (Moushumi Chatterjee) and Bahadur (Deven Verma) is married to Prema (Aruna Irani). They all stay together with Sudha's younger sister Tanu (Deepti Naval). Into their lives enter the other Ashok, a detective novel aficionado, and Bahadur, a bhang lover. Now there are two Ashoks and two Bahadurs in the same city. This is more than their families, the Jeweller, the Taxi Driver and the Inspector can handle.

Cast 
Sanjeev Kumar in a double role as twin brothers Ashok Tilak and Ashok Tilak.
Moushmi Chatterjee as Sudha Tilak, Ashok's wife
Deepti Naval as Tanu, Sudha's sister
Deven Verma in a double role as twin brothers Bahadur and Bahadur.
Aruna Irani as Prema, Bahadur's wife
Yunus Parvez as Mansoor Miyan, Chhedilal's worker
C. S. Dubey as Chhedilal, a jeweller
T. P. Jain as Ganeshilal, a diamond merchant
Padma Chavan as Alka, Ashok's friend
Rammohan Sharma as Taxi Driver
Shammi as Ashok's mother
Utpal Dutt as Raj Tilak, Ashok's father (Cameo)
Raj Kumar Kapoor as Inspector Sinha
Arjun Chakraborty as an office assistant under Ashok Tilak
 Kamaldeep as 'Angoor' landlord
 Raj Mata as Kashibai

Soundtrack

Awards and nominations

 30th Filmfare Awards:

Won

 Best Comedian – Deven Verma

Nominated

 Best Actor – Sanjeev Kumar

Home media
The DVD version of the film was released by IndiaWeekly under its own label.

Notes 
 Both twins were given the same name at birth.

References

External links 
 

1982 films
1980s Hindi-language films
Films scored by R. D. Burman
Modern adaptations of works by William Shakespeare
Films based on The Comedy of Errors
Twins in Indian films
Films about twins
1982 comedy films
Films based on Indian novels
Indian films based on plays
Films with screenplays by Gulzar
Films directed by Gulzar
Indian comedy films
Hindi-language comedy films